Ángel Gómez (born 11 April 1994) is a Paraguayan footballer who plays as a forward. He is currently a free agent.

Career
Gómez started out in the youth ranks of Cerro Porteño. He first appeared for the club's senior squad during the 2015 Paraguayan Primera División season, making his debut professional appearance on 9 July during a loss away to Deportivo Capiatá.

Career statistics

References

External links

1994 births
Living people
People from San Lorenzo, Paraguay
Paraguayan footballers
Association football forwards
Paraguayan Primera División players
Cerro Porteño players